Shokir Muminov (born February 17, 1983) is an Uzbek judoka.

He won a bronze medal at the lightweight (73 kg) category of the 2006 Asian Games, defeating Aidar Kabimollayev of Kazakhstan at the bronze medal match. 
At the 2010 Asian Games held in Guangzhou, he tested positive for methylhexanamine and was stripped of his silver medal.

References

External links
 
 

 2006 Asian Games profile

1983 births
Living people
Uzbeks
Uzbekistani male judoka
Judoka at the 2008 Summer Olympics
Olympic judoka of Uzbekistan
Asian Games medalists in judo
Judoka at the 2006 Asian Games
Judoka at the 2010 Asian Games
Asian Games bronze medalists for Uzbekistan
Medalists at the 2006 Asian Games
21st-century Uzbekistani people